Ka Hao is a New Zealand youth choir that formed in 2019. Coming from the Gisborne District, the group performs music in the Māori language. In 2020 the group won the Mana Reo Award at the 2020 Aotearoa Music Awards, as a part of the supergroup Mōhau. In 2021 the group released their debut single "35", which after gaining popularity through TikTok was one of the most successful songs performed in Māori during Te Wiki o te Reo Māori 2021.

Background

Ka Hao formed in Te Tairāwhiti / Gisborne District, as a project to promote and revitalise te Reo Māori. The group's name refers to the proverb ka pū te ruha, ka hao te rangatahi (as the old fishing net is worn, a new one is made), referring to youth growing up and entering adulthood. The approximately 24 members attended Kura Kaupapa Māori (immersion schools), and many are Ngāti Porou, while all have strong ties to te Tairāwhiti. Ka Hao first performed in October 2019 as a part of the Te Tairāwhiti Arts Festival. In January 2020, the group released a live album of gospel waiata in te Reo, as a part of the supergroup Mōhau. The album won the Te Māngai Pāho Mana Reo Award and the Best Worship Artist Te Kaipuoro Kairangi Toa award at the 2020 Aotearoa Music Awards.

Ka Hao released their debut single "35" in September 2021, a song that references State Highway 35. The song, featuring Rob Ruha, gained popularity during Te Wiki o te Reo Māori in 2021 after the song became popular on TikTok. The group released their debut album Ka Hao: One Tira, One Voice on 17 September, after being mentored by Anglican bishop Don Tamihere, musician Rob Ruha and music manager Cilla Ruha. Ka Hao were later featured on one of the singles preceding singer Rob Ruha's album Preservation of Scenery.

Discography

Studio albums

Singles

As lead artist

As featured artist

Other charted songs

Guest appearances

References

2019 establishments in New Zealand
Musical groups established in 2019
Māori-language singers
New Zealand choirs
New Zealand Māori musical groups
New Zealand Māori singers
Ngāti Porou
People from Gisborne, New Zealand
Te Whānau-ā-Apanui